Red Devils (also known as The Hunt for Blue Fox) is a revolutionary adventure story written by the secretary of the Governorate Committee of the Kostroma RCP (B), novelist and screenwriter Pavel Blyakhin in 1921 and published in 1923–1926. The book became popular after the film adaptation of the novel in 1923.

Process
The author describes the process of writing the story:

Plot
The novel is about the adventures of three young agents, fighters of the 1st Cavalry Army, set against the background of the Russian Civil War and the struggle with the Makhnovist forces. At the beginning Nestor Makhno and his troops attack the village, committing various crimes, including murdering peasants, robbing huts, stealing livestock and killing Communists. In the attack, one guy's father is captured, tortured and killed under Makhno's orders. Afterwards, the three of them organize a detachment against Makhno.

Characters
 Misha and Dunyasha are young scouts, soldiers in the First Cavalry Army.
 Chinese man Yu-Yu
 Bat'ko Makhno
 Yesaul
 The bandits

Makhno
The novel gives a negative portrayal of the anarchist Nestor Makhno. For example:

Films
 Red Devils (film)
 The Elusive Avengers

References

Russian short stories
1926 short stories
Cultural depictions of Nestor Makhno